Harold Norse (July 6, 1916, New York City – June 8, 2009, San Francisco) was an American writer who created a body of work using the American idiom of everyday language and images. One of the expatriate artists of the Beat generation, Norse was widely published and anthologized.

Life 
Born Harold Rosen to an unmarried Lithuanian Jewish immigrant in Brooklyn. In the early 1950s, he came up with the new last name, Norse, by rearranging the letters in Rosen.

He received his B.A. from Brooklyn College in 1938, where he edited the literary magazine. Norse met Chester Kallman in 1938, and then became a part of W. H. Auden's "inner circle" when Auden moved to the U.S. in 1939. (Kallman and Auden later became lifelong partners.) However, Norse soon found himself allied with William Carlos Williams, who rated Norse the 'best poet of [his] generation.'  Norse broke with traditional verse forms and embraced a more direct, conversational language. Soon Norse was publishing in Poetry, The Saturday Review and The Paris Review. He got his master's degree in literature from New York University in 1951. His first book of poems, The Undersea Mountain, was published in 1953.

From 1954 to 1959 Norse lived and wrote in Italy. He penned the experimental cut-up novel Beat Hotel in 1960 while living in Paris with William S. Burroughs, Allen Ginsberg and Gregory Corso from 1959 to 1963. He traveled to Tangier, where he stayed with Jane and Paul Bowles. Returning to America in 1968, Norse arrived in Venice, California, near Charles Bukowski. He moved to San Francisco in 1972 and lived in the Mission District of San Francisco for the last 35 years of his life.

Memoirs of a Bastard Angel traces Norse's life and literary career with Auden, Christopher Isherwood, E. E. Cummings, Tennessee Williams, William Carlos Williams, James Baldwin, Dylan Thomas, William Burroughs, Allen Ginsberg, Lawrence Ferlinghetti, Paul Bowles, Charles Bukowski, Robert Graves and Anaïs Nin. With Carnivorous Saint: Gay Poems 1941–1976 Norse became a leading gay liberation poet. His collected poems, In the Hub of the Fiery Force, appeared in 2003.

Norse is a two-time NEA grant recipient, and National Poetry Association award winner.

Norse was gay and his poetry reflected his sexuality.

Works 
 The Undersea Mountain, Denver: Swallow Press, 1953
 The Roman Sonnets of Giuseppe Gioachino Belli, Highlands, North Carolina: Jargon 38, 1960
 The Dancing Beasts, New York: Macmillan, 1962
 Karma Circuit, London: Nothing Doing in London, 1966
 Penguin Modern Poets 13, Charles Bukowski, Philip Lamantia and Harold Norse, Harmondsworth: Penguin, 1969
 Bastard Angel Magazine, Issue #1, Edited by Harold Norse, San Francisco, Spring 1972
 Karma Circuit, San Francisco: Panjandrum Press, 1973
 Bastard Angel Magazine, Issue #2, Edited by Harold Norse, San Francisco, Spring 1974
 Hotel Nirvana, San Francisco: City Lights, 1974
I See America Daily, San Francisco: Mother's Hen, 1974
 Bastard Angel Magazine, Issue #3, Edited by Harold Norse, San Francisco, Fall 1974
 Beat Hotel, German translation by Carl Weissner, Augsburg, Federal Republic of Germany: Maro Verlag, 1975, 1995
 Carnivorous Saint: Gay Poems 1941–1976, San Francisco: Gay Sunshine Press, 1977
 Beat Hotel (the English original), San Diego: Atticus Press, 1983
 Mysteries of Magritte, San Diego: Atticus Press, 1984
 Beat Hotel, Italian translation by Giulio Saponaro, Italy: Stamperia della Frontiera, 1985
 The Love Poems 1940–1985, Trumansburg, NY: The Crossing Press, 1986
 Memoirs of a Bastard Angel, preface by James Baldwin, New York: William Morrow and Company, 1989
 The American Idiom: A Correspondence, with William Carlos Williams, San Francisco: Bright Tyger Press, 1990
 In the Hub of the Fiery Force, Collected Poems of Harold Norse 1934–2003, New York: Thunder's Mouth Press, 2003
 I Am Going to Fly Through Glass: The Selected Poems of Harold Norse, edited by Todd Swindell, Greenfield, MA: Talisman House, 2014
 Karmakreis, German translation of Karma Circuit by Ralf Zühlke, Wenzendorf: Stadtlichter Presse, 2016

Anthologies 
New Directions 13, ed. James Laughlin, 1951
Mentor, New American Library, 1958
City Lights Journal, ed. L. Ferlinghetti, #1, 1963
Best Poems of 1968: Borestone Mountain Poetry Awards, ed. Hildegarde Flanner, 1969
City Lights Anthology, ed. Ferlinghetti, City Lights 1974
A Geography of Poets, ed. Edward Field, Bantam 1979
The Penguin Book of Homosexual Verse, ed. Stephen Coote, Penguin 1983
Gay and Lesbian Poetry in Our Time: An Anthology, ed. Carl Morse and Joan Larkin, St. Martin's Press, 1988
An Ear to the Ground, ed. Harris & Aguero, University of Chicago Press, 1989
Big Sky Mind: Buddhism & the Beat Generation, ed. Carole Tonkinson, Riverhead Books, NY, 1995
City Lights Pocket Poets Anthology, City Lights, 1995
The Outlaw Bible of American Poetry, ed. Alan Kaufman and S.A. Griffin, Thunder's Mouth Press, 1999

Resources 
 The Harold Norse Papers (1934–1980, 8,000 items) are archived at the Lilly Library, Indiana University, Bloomington.
 Harold Norse, James Baldwin, Anais Nin, William S. Burroughs, William Carlos Williams, Paul Carroll, Jack Hirschman, "Harold Norse Special Issue", Olé, No. 5 (Bensenville, IL: Open Skull Press, n.d., 1966?)

References

External links 
haroldnorse.com, Memorial Web site with poems and photos

 Beat museum: "Harold Norse"
  Biography, with bibliography
Harold Norse entry at Web site devoted to glbtq culture
Harold Norse Collection
L.A. Times Obituary
N.Y. Times Obituary
S.F. Chronicle Obituary
Guardian U.K. Obituary
Remembering Harold Norse

Brooklyn College alumni
New York University alumni
Writers from Brooklyn
American gay writers
Beat Generation writers
American expatriates in France
American expatriates in Italy
American expatriates in Morocco
American people of Lithuanian-Jewish descent
Outlaw poets
LGBT Jews
American LGBT poets
Jewish American poets
1916 births
2009 deaths
20th-century American Jews
21st-century American Jews
20th-century American LGBT people
Gay poets